The Ferndale Schools is a school district headquartered at the Administrative Offices on the Ferndale High School Campus in Ferndale, Michigan in Greater Detroit. It is a four square mile district, including all of Pleasant Ridge, most of Ferndale, and portions of Oak Park and Royal Oak Township.

In 2015, the district began a radical restructuring process, led by the Board of Education and deeply dependent on community involvement. Changes to curriculum, expansion of academic opportunities for students and site transitions were all based on the district's strategic plan.

Schools 
 Ferndale Early Childhood Center (Preschool)
 Lower Elementary School, at Roosevelt; new Lower Elementary opening 2023, Roosevelt to become CASA (K-2)
 Upper Elementary School, at Kennedy (3-5)
 Ferndale Middle School (6-8)
 Ferndale High School (9-12) - Comprehensive high school
 University High School (9-12) - College-Prep high school
 Tri-County Educational Center (9-12) - Adult and alternative high school

Former schools 
 Roosevelt Primary School (now Lower Elementary, to be converted into CASA 2023)
 Coolidge Intermediate School (now University High School)
 Best School (later Kennedy, now Upper Elementary)
 John F. Kennedy Elementary School (now Upper Elementary)
 Harding School (now Ferndale Early Childhood Center)
 Jackson School (now Jackson Center, CASA; to be demolished 2023)
 Jefferson Center (closed)
 Lincoln High School, later Lincoln Junior High School (demolished)
 Taft Digital Learning Center (demolished)
 Washington School (now Kulick Community Center)
 Wilson University High School (demolished)

The high schools had an average score of 11.8 on the state's MEAP test in 2011.

Adult & Alternative Education Schools 
 Tri-County Educational Center

References

External links

Ferndale Public Schools
Ferndale Forward

School districts in Michigan
Education in Oakland County, Michigan